Stephen Scherr  is the Chief Executive Officer of Hertz and a member of the company’s Board of Directors since February 2022.

Career 
Prior to joining Hertz, Scherr spent 28 years at Goldman Sachs in several different strategic and operational leadership roles. Before leaving Goldman Sachs, Scherr served as the Chief Financial Officer from 2018 to 2021.

In 2016, Scherr led Goldman Sachs’ launch of consumer banking, branded as Marcus. He also served as CFO during the firm’s launch of AppleCard, in partnership with Apple, Inc., in 2019.

Scherr was named Goldman Sachs’ Chief Strategy Officer in 2014, appointed to the Goldman Sachs Management Committee in 2012, became head of Goldman Sachs’ Latin American operations in 2011 and served as the company’s Global Head of Financing.

Scherr joined Goldman Sachs in 1993 as an investment banker, coming from practicing law at Cravath, Swaine & Moore.

Affiliations 
Scherr serves on the board of the New York Stem Cell Foundation and the Jewish Museum in New York. He is also a member of The Council on Foreign Relations.

Education 
Scherr received his Juris Doctor at Harvard Law School. Before that he attended Woodrow Wilson School of Public and International Affairs at Princeton University where he obtained a bachelor of arts degree.

References 

American chief executives
Harvard Law School alumni
Princeton University alumni
Goldman Sachs people
American chief financial officers
Living people
Year of birth missing (living people)